

1949

1950

1954

1955

1956

1957

1958

1959

Notes

References

External links
 Nigeria: Fixtures and Results – FIFA.com
 Nigeria national football team complete 'A' international record – 11v11.com

1940s in Nigeria
1950s in Nigeria
1949–1959